1986 Emperor's Cup Final was the 66th final of the Emperor's Cup competition. The final was played at National Stadium in Tokyo on January 1, 1987. Yomiuri won the championship.

Overview
Yomiuri won their 2nd title, by defeating Nippon Kokan 2–0. Yomiuri was featured a squad consisting of Yasutaro Matsuki, Hisashi Kato, Ruy Ramos, Tetsuya Totsuka and Nobuhiro Takeda.

Match details

See also
1986 Emperor's Cup

References

Emperor's Cup
1986 in Japanese football
Tokyo Verdy matches